The Day Point Formation is a geologic formation in New York and Vermont. It preserves fossils dating back to the Ordovician period.

See also

 List of fossiliferous stratigraphic units in New York

References
 

Ordovician geology of New York (state)
Ordovician geology of Vermont
Ordovician southern paleotemperate deposits